Soldiers Hill may refer to one of:

Suburbs
 Soldiers Hill, Victoria, a suburb of Ballarat including the hill after which it was named
 Soldiers Hill, Queensland, a suburb of Mount Isa
 A landform (hill) near Culcairn, New South Wales